Tim Tolkien (born October 1962) is an English sculptor who has designed several monumental sculptures, including the award-winning Sentinel.

He has a metal sculpture and public Art business at Cradley Heath, West Midlands.  He is also a bass player and member of the band Klangstorm, founded in 1996.

Early life
Tim is the great-nephew of the writer J. R. R. Tolkien. He was raised in the village of Hughenden Valley and went to the Royal Grammar School, High Wycombe. He graduated with a degree in fine art (sculpture) from the University of Reading in 1984.

Works

Sentinel
Sentinel is Tolkien's most famous work to date.  In 1996, he was appointed by CAN who were awarded the contract to develop public art proposals for the estate using National Lottery money, as an artist in residence to help with regeneration of the Castle Vale estate in Birmingham.  The following year, he consulted with residents about an art project for the entrance to the estate.  They favoured a sculpture featuring Spitfires, reflecting the area's flying history and particularly the Castle Bromwich Assembly which stood nearby.  The large steel and aluminium Sentinel Spitfire sculpture was the result, showing three Spitfires peeling off up into the air in different directions.  It was unveiled on 14 November 2000, near the former factory which built them, by their former test pilot Alex Henshaw.

Cedric Hardwicke
Tolkien also sculpted a memorial to the actor Sir Cedric Hardwicke, at the latter's birthplace of Lye, West Midlands, for Dudley Metropolitan Borough Council.  The memorial takes the form of a giant filmstrip, the illuminated cut metal panels illustrating scenes from some of Sir Cedric's best-known roles, which include The Hunchback of Notre Dame, The Shape of Things to Come, and The Ghost of Frankenstein. It was unveiled in November 2005.

Ent
His proposals for a 20-foot (6.1 meter) high statue of Treebeard, an Ent from The Lord of the Rings, to be erected on the Green at Moseley, near J. R. R. Tolkien's childhood home in Birmingham, have met with some controversy, but permission for its erection – originally scheduled for May 2007 – was granted by Birmingham City Council.

Catalogue 

Tolkien also undertook the redesign of Lea Hall railway station, Birmingham, with Eric Klein Velderman; completed in 1998)

Other notable work
He has also worked with the singer and television presenter Toyah Willcox, designing her armour-like stage costumes and, in 2005, making a documentary film for BBC2, comparing New Zealand's successful exploitation of its movie-related J. R. R. Tolkien associations, with that of J.R.R.'s (and Toyah's) home town, Birmingham.

References

External links

Sentinel Spitfire sculpture
Birmingham Post: Tolkien statue plan splits community
Lye movie star gets civic honour
Klangstorm
review
archived website
Toyah
Armour for Toyah
Film with Toyah

1962 births
Living people
English sculptors
English male sculptors
People educated at the Royal Grammar School, High Wycombe
Alumni of the University of Reading
20th-century British sculptors
People from Wycombe District
People from Cradley Heath
Tim
English people of German descent